Hornsby railway station is located at the junction of the Main Northern and North Shore lines, serving the Sydney suburb of Hornsby. It is served by Sydney Trains T1 North Shore Line and T9 Northern Line services and NSW TrainLink Intercity and regional services.

History
The station opened on 17 September 1886 as Hornsby, but was renamed Hornsby Junction on 1 November 1894. This was due to the construction of Normanhurst station to the south, which was initially named Hornsby as it was located in what was the more densely populated area of Hornsby at the time. Naming the station Hornsby Junction was an attempt to avoid confusion, but it was realised that having two Hornsby stations was still very confusing. On 1 May 1900, the suburb and station to the south was renamed Normanhurst, and Hornsby Junction reverted to Hornsby.

On 1 January 1890, Hornsby became a junction station with the opening of the North Shore line to St Leonards. In 1894, a third platform was built along with a locomotive depot to the east of the station. Hornsby was the northern extremity of the electrified network from 1930 until it was extended to Gosford in 1960. The wires did continue north of the station as far as the Hornsby Maintenance Depot.

As part of the CityRail Clearways Project, a fifth platform was constructed for use by through northbound trains. To allow for the new line, the Hornsby Signal Box was shifted 120 metres in 2007. The new platform opened on 16 March 2009, with the existing Platform 4 becoming a turnback platform for Northern line trains. The additional platform allows extra trains to run on the Northern line via the Epping to Chatswood line and improves reliability. As Hornsby is both an originating and terminating point for some services, on 10 July 2003 the communications system in a Millennium Train failed because the train's software could not compute that the origin and destination of the service had the same name.

Platforms and services

Transport links

Hillsbus operates one route to and from Hornsby station:
600: to Parramatta station via Thornleigh, Pennant Hills, Cherrybrook, Castle Hill and Baulkham Hills.

Transdev NSW operates nine routes to and from Hornsby station:
575: to Macquarie University via Turramurra
587: to Westleigh
588: to Normanhurst West
589: to Sydney Adventist Hospital 
592: to Brooklyn & Mooney Mooney 
595: to Mount Colah  
596: to Hornsby Heights  
597: to Berowra station 
598: Hornsby Loop via Asquith

Hornsby is also the terminus of two NightRide routes:
N80: to Town Hall station via Strathfield
N90: to Town Hall station via Chatswood

Trackplan

References

External links

Hornsby station details Transport for New South Wales
Hornsby Station Public Transport Map Transport for NSW
Flickr gallery showing construction of Platform 5

Easy Access railway stations in Sydney
Railway stations in Sydney
Railway stations in Australia opened in 1886
Main North railway line, New South Wales
North Shore railway line
Hornsby, New South Wales